St.–Jakobus–Bruderschaft (Brotherhood of St James) is an ecumenical order of Lutheran, Roman Catholic and Eastern Orthodox Christians in Germany within League for Evangelical-Catholic Reunion. It was founded in 1964.

In Christian ecumenism, Brotherhood holds to transsubstantiation, Office of St Peter and honour to Blessed Virgin Mary.

Rule
The spirituality of the Brotherhood is oriented to the example of Saint James and formed by Evangelical counsels, although without celibacy or common life in community. The rule of life includes e.g. daily prayer for reunion, reading of Holy Bible in lectio continua and use of private confession.

The Brotherhood gathers together one a year. One of the most notable members is Hansjürgen Knoche.

External links
St. - Jakobus - Bruderschaft 
Definition of doctrine 

Lutheran orders and societies
Christian organisations based in Germany
Christian organizations established in 1964
Christian religious orders established in the 20th century